Atractaspis dahomeyensis, or the Dahomey burrowing asp, is a species of venomous snake in the Atractaspididae family.

Geographic range 
It is endemic to Africa.

Description
Atractaspis dahomeyensis is black dorsally. It is brown ventrally, and the ventral scales are edged with lighter brown.

Snout prominent and cuneiform. Dorsal scales arranged in 31 rows. Ventrals 240; anal entire; subcaudals 24, partly entire, partly divided.

Total length ; tail .

References

Atractaspididae
Reptiles described in 1887